Quark is a 1977 American science fiction sitcom starring Richard Benjamin. Broadcast on Friday nights at 8:00–8:30 p.m. on NBC, the pilot aired on May 7, 1977, and the series followed as a mid-season replacement in February 1978. The series was cancelled in April 1978. Quark was created by Buck Henry, co-creator of the spy spoof Get Smart.

Plot
The show was set on a United Galaxy Sanitation Patrol Cruiser, an interstellar garbage scow operating out of United Galaxy Space Station Perma One in the year 2226. Adam Quark, the main character, works to clean up trash in space by collecting "space baggies" with his trusted and highly unusual crew.
 
Quark draws heavily from Star Trek: The Original Series as a source of parody. In its short run, specific episodes also satirized such science fiction as Star Wars, 2001: A Space Odyssey, Buck Rogers, and Flash Gordon. Three of the episodes were direct parodies of Star Trek episodes.

Characters 
 Adam Quark (Richard Benjamin) is a Commander who longs for a glamorous, important assignment and ends up collecting trash instead. He is skilled and competent, but extraordinarily unlucky.
 Betty I and Betty II, a.k.a. The Bettys (Cyb and Patricia Barnstable) are the navigators and pilots of the ship. They are completely identical, with identical red-hot passions for Quark. One of them is a clone of the other, but each claims the other one is the clone. They have a tendency to speak in perfect unison and have exactly the same thought at exactly the same time. Quark, when describing his crew, explains that he is in love with Betty, but he is not sure which one.
 Gene/Jean (Tim Thomerson) is a "transmute", a humanoid being with a complete set of both male and female chromosomes. He/she serves as the ship's engineer. The gender confusion manifests in a split personality—when Gene's macho male side is in control, he is gung-ho, angry and violent with a pathological hatred of the Klingon-like "Gorgons", while the much more mild-mannered Jean personality is stereotypically feminine and demure, pacifistic and a bit of a coward. He/she will frequently switch personalities with no warning, and usually at the worst possible time.
 Ficus Pandorata (Richard Kelton) is Quark's Spock-like science officer and is a "Vegeton", a member of a race of sentient plant life (Ficus pandorata or pandurata is better known as Ficus lyrata, the fiddle-leaf fig). He is of completely human appearance although he tends to shrivel up when he gets dehydrated. While he is extremely intelligent, observant and always calmly rational, he is incapable of any sort of human emotion, including both fear and tact. He frequently finds the behavior of the rest of the crew difficult to understand, his curiosity leading him to have philosophical debates about the human condition with Quark, usually at the most inopportune moments. Kelton died of accidental carbon monoxide poisoning on November 27, 1978, only seven months after the series was cancelled.
 Andy (Bobby Porter) is a not-at-all-human-looking robot, made from spare parts, with a cowardly and neurotic personality. 
 Otto Bob Palindrome (Conrad Janis) is in charge of Perma One, and gives Commander Quark his assignments. He is a stereotypical bureaucrat who gives new definition to the word "petty" — a nightmare tyrant to his underlings and a quivering toady towards his superiors. Palindrome seems to take a special delight in making Quark's life miserable, although deep down he does seem to have a certain well-hidden affection for Adam. His first name, "Otto", is a palindrome, as is his middle name, "Bob."
 Dink is a diminutive and very hairy alien aide to Palindrome who resembles a curly blond version of Cousin Itt. His voice is a xylophone-like electronic warble. He often provides a foil for Palindrome's concerns about his job and about Quark, both of whom he comes to for dating advice. There is another member of his species on Perma 1 called Dook whose masses of long hair resemble brown and red wool.
 The Head (Alan Caillou) is the being to whom Palindrome answers. He is usually seen as a disembodied head with an enormous cranium. He is detached from day-to-day events, has a low tolerance for failure, and a tendency to come up with bizarre tasks for Quark to accomplish — usually at the worst possible time. His trademark sign-off is "The galaxy, ad infinitum!"
 Interface (Misty Rowe) is a four-armed alien woman who functioned as an operator for all interstellar calls. The perfect example of a communications bureaucrat, she is more concerned about correct charges for lasergrams than about saving the Galaxy. Appeared only in the pilot but is mentioned in at least one later episode.
 Ergo is a multi-eyed little blob that was Quark's pet, paralleling Pinback and the Alien from the movie Dark Star. In the pilot, the colorless and translucent Ergo seemed intent on killing Quark, but in the final episode when he appeared again he was much more subdued and pea soup green in color.

Episodes

Reception

Awards
The series won one Emmy Award nomination, for costume designer Grady Hunt's work in the episode "All the Emperor's Quasi-Norms, Part 2".

In popular culture
In the television series Breaking Bad, the character Gale Boetticher creates a music video of himself singing "Major Tom (Coming Home)" by Peter Schilling with footage of Quark in the background. It originally appeared in short in the episode "Bullet Points," but the full music video was later released online by AMC.

Home media
The complete series was released on DVD on October 14, 2008.

References

External links
 (Pilot)
 (Series)

1970s American sitcoms
1977 American television series debuts
1978 American television series endings
1970s American comic science fiction television series
1970s American satirical television series
English-language television shows
NBC original programming
Parodies of Star Trek
Space adventure television series
Parody television series based on Star Wars
Television series by Sony Pictures Television
Television series created by Buck Henry
Television series set in the 23rd century